A toilet is a small room used for privately accessing the sanitation fixture (toilet) for urination and defecation. Toilet rooms often include a sink (basin) with soap/handwash for handwashing, as this is important for personal hygiene. These rooms are typically referred to as "half-bathrooms" (half-baths; half of a whole or full-bathroom) in a private residence. 

This room is commonly known as a "bathroom" in American English, a lavatory or loo in the United Kingdom, a "washroom" in Canadian English, and by many other names across the English-speaking world.

Names

"Toilet" originally referred to personal grooming and came by metonymy to be used for the personal rooms used for bathing, dressing, and so on. It was then euphemistically used for the similarly private rooms used for urination and defecation. By metonymy, it then came to refer directly to the fixtures in such rooms. At present, the word refers primarily to such fixtures and using "toilet" to refer to the room or activity ("use the toilet") is somewhat blunt and may be considered indiscreet. It is, however, a useful term since it is quickly understood by English-speakers across the world, whereas more polite terms vary by region.

"Lavatory" (from the Latin , "wash basin" or "washroom") was common in the 19th century and is still broadly understood, although it is taken as quite formal in American English, and more often refers to public toilets in Britain. The contraction "lav" is commonly used in British English.

In American English, the most common term for a private toilet is "bathroom", regardless of whether a bathtub or shower is present. In British English, "bathroom" is a common term but is typically reserved for private rooms primarily used for bathing; a room without a bathtub or shower is more often known as a "WC", an abbreviation for water closet, "lavatory", or "loo". Other terms are also used, some as part of a regional dialect.

Some forms of jargon have their own terms for toilets, including "lavatory" on commercial airplanes, "head" on ships, and "latrine" in military contexts. Larger houses often have a secondary room with a toilet and sink for use by guests. These are typically known as "powder rooms" or "half-baths" (half-bathroom) in North America, and "cloakrooms" in Britain.

Other items in the room 
The main item in the room is the sanitation fixture itself, the toilet. This may be the flushing sort, which is plumbed into a cistern (tank) operated by a ballcock (float valve). Or it may be a dry model, which does not need water.

The toilet room may also include a plunger, a rubber or plastic tool mounted on a handle, which is used to remove blockages from the toilet drain. Toilets often have a wall mirror above the sink for grooming, checking one's appearance and/or makeup. Some toilets have a cupboard where cleaning supplies and personal hygiene products may be kept. If it is a flush toilet, then the room usually also includes a toilet brush for cleaning the bowl.

Methods of anal cleansing vary between cultures. If the norm is to use paper, then typically the room will have a toilet roll holder, with the toilet paper hanging either next to or away from the wall. If instead, people are used to cleaning themselves with water, then the room may include a bidet shower (health faucet) or a bidet. Toilets such as the Washlet, popular in Japan, provide an automatic washing function.

A sink (hand basin), with soap, is usually present in the room or immediately outside it, to ensure easy handwashing.  Above the sink there may be a mirror, either mounted on the wall, or on a medicine cabinet. This cabinet (which is more typically located in the household's main bathroom) typically contains prescription and over the counter drugs, first aid supplies, and grooming equipment for shaving or makeup.

History 

Into the modern era, humans typically practiced open defecation or employed latrines or outhouses over a pit toilet in rural areas and used chamber pots emptied into streets or drains in urban ones. The Indus Valley civilization had particularly advanced sanitation, which included common use of private flush toilets. The ancient Greeks and Romans had public toilets and, in some cases, indoor plumbing connected to rudimentary sewer systems. The latrines of medieval monasteries were known as reredorters; in some cases, these were connected to sophisticated water systems that swept its effluent away without affecting the community's drinking, cooking, or washing water. and some other countries, separate toilets remain the norm for reasons of hygiene and privacy. In modern homes outside of France, such separate toilets typically contain a sink. In Japan, the toilet sometimes has a built-in sink (whose waste water is used for the next flush) to allow users to clean themselves immediately. Japanese toilets also often provide special slippers—apart from those worn in the rest of the house—for use within the toilet.

Society and culture 
In English, all terms for toilets were originally euphemisms. It is generally considered coarse or even offensive to use such direct terms as "shitter", although they are used in some areas. Formerly, broadcast censorship even banned mentions of the euphemisms: Jack Paar temporarily quit the Tonight Show in February 1960 when NBC broadcast news footage in place of a joke he had taped involving the term "WC".

Gallery

See also 
 Bathroom (for personal hygiene, with or without a toilet inside)
 Sanitation

Notes

References

Toilets
Bathrooms